Harpactira pulchripes, also known as the golden blue-legged baboon spider, is a bright yellow bodied and metallic blue legged tarantula found in South Africa. It was first described by Reginald Innes Pocock in 1901. It is a very highly desired tarantula in the European and American tarantula keeping hobby. Its specific name pulchripes is derived from Latin "pulchri" meaning beautiful, and "pes" meaning feet, forming the name beautiful feet.

Description 
Harpactira pulchripes has metallic blue legs. This blue color follows from the tarsus all the way to the trochanter, where it changes to a vivid orange or yellow. Its carapace is orange or yellow with some black patterning which is the same with the opisthosoma. There exist sexual dimorphism, as the males have longer legs and females have duller colors, females reaching a maximum diagonal leg span of 14 cm while males reach 10 cm. Females live to around 12 years, while males only live to 2 to 3. This spider has medically significant venom, though there is not much information about the strength of the venom.

Habitat 
This tarantula is found in South Africa in Grahamstown, now known as Makhanda, where its mainly arid with average temperatures of 25 °C, an average yearly rain fall of 628 mm, and an average humidity of 77%, with the average height above sea level being 580m.

Behavior 
This spider is a fossorial old world tarantula, with medically significant venom. Though being part of the Harpactirinae subfamily, known for being aggressive, and overall mean, though this tarantula is the exception, they have a noticeably more relaxed temper than other in its subfamily. They are incredibly fast, though this spider would be skittish rather than defensive, which is odd considering their medically significantly venom. Going in favor of their calm demeanor, is how they display pretty commonly in their web, making them great for a first old world tarantula.

References

Endemic fauna of South Africa
Theraphosidae
Spiders of South Africa
Spiders described in 1901